The 1998 Navy Midshipmen football team represented the United States Naval Academy (USNA) as an independent  during the 1998 NCAA Division I-A football season. The team was led by fourth-year head coach Charlie Weatherbie.

Schedule

Personnel

References

Navy
Navy Midshipmen football seasons
Navy Midshipmen football